The  is a railway line of the Ōigawa Railway. It runs from Senzu Station in Kawanehon, Shizuoka, the end station of the Ōigawa Main Line, and terminates at Ikawa Station in Aoi-ku, Shizuoka. The line has 61 tunnels and 51 bridges along its 25.5 kilometer length and includes the only rack-and-pinion railway section currently operating in Japan.

History
The Ikawa line began operations on March 20, 1935, as a private line for the Ōigawa Electric Company, to carry workers and materials upstream to facilitate dam construction. The single track line was originally constructed with  narrow gauge; however, in order to have dual usage with carriages on the Senzu-Shinrin Line (now closed) a third rail was added the following year for the Japanese standard gauge. In 1954, the line was extended under the aegis of the Chubu Electric Power Company to facilitate the construction of the Ōigawa Dam. Railway operations were spun out of Chubu Electric into a separate company in 1959, with the foundation of the Ōigawa Railway Company. With the completion of the Nagashima Dam, a portion of the line had to be re-routed along a 1.5 km section with a maximum gradient of 9% (~1 in 11). This required the installation of an Abt rack system on October 2, 1990. An automatic train stop system was installed at the end of March 2009.

The line runs through an isolated mountain area with no cities or towns, and has a very small population density. Most of the passengers are tourists visiting one of the hot spring resorts along the line, or alpinists and hikers heading for the peaks of the Southern Alps National Park.

Former connecting lines
 Sawama station - the 762mm gauge Sen-to forest railway, consisting of a 36km 'main line', branches 6km and 4km long and a 1.4km cableway, operated between 1934 and 1968.

Stations

See also
 List of railway lines in Japan

External links 

  

Railway lines in Japan
Rail transport in Shizuoka Prefecture
Rack railways in Japan
Railway lines opened in 1935
1067 mm gauge railways in Japan
2 ft 6 in gauge railways in Japan